Fene is a municipality in the  province of A Coruña in the autonomous community of Galicia in northwestern Spain. It is located to the northeast of Galicia on the Ria of Ferrol.

Economy 
The Navantia Shipyards and services in the parts which are nearer Ferrol, the rest of the borough devotes itself to farming, agriculture and fishing.

In the late 1960s the gantry crane of the shipyards of Astilleros y Talleres del Noroeste (ASTANO) in Ferrolterra was the largest in Europe.

References

Municipalities in the Province of A Coruña